Yhyаkh (Yakut: Ыһыах) is the New Year holiday in the Sakha Republic.

Celebration 
Sakha people celebrate the New Year twice a year – in winter with the rest of citizens of Russia, and in summer – according to the ancient traditions. Yakutia is the largest region of Russia. The winter temperatures sometimes reach −60 °C, while the summer is very short, lasting only three months. The holiday is celebrated in the middle of June, at the beginning of summer.

The Sakha Yhyakh festival (literally meaning "abundance") is related to a cult of a solar deity, with a fertility cult. Before the German invasion of the Soviet Union it was held on 22 June, the longest day of the year. However, after 1941, as the date of Yhyakh had coincided with the beginning of Operation Barbarossa, it began to be celebrated in the period between 10 and 25 June.

Ancient Sakha celebrated the New Year at the Yhyаkh festival. Its traditions include women and children decorating trees and tethering posts with "salama" (nine bunches of horse hair hung on horse-hair ropes). The oldest man, wearing white, opens the holiday. He starts the ritual by sprinkling kymys on the ground, feeding the fire. He prays to the Ai-ii spirits for the well-being of the people who depend on them and asks the spirits to bless all the people gathered.

Afterwards, people sing and dance Ohuakhai, play national games, eat national dishes, and drink kymys.

During years of stagnation, the traditional ceremony was almost forgotten. Nevertheless, the 21st century saw a revival of Sakha culture, including Yhyakh. Until 1990, when the first Yhyakh was held in Yakutsk, traditionally accurate celebrations were only held in a few regions of the republic.

Ohuokhai Dance 

The Ohuokhai (Оhуохай) dance has its roots in the period when the Sakha people lived further south and were cattle-breeders, termed "sun worshippers". It is a native dance that combines three forms of art: dancing, singing and poetry. The Sakha word for "dance", Üngküü (Yҥкүү) comes from the verb üng (Үҥ, "to worship").

The Ohuokhai is a simultaneous round dance and song. Dancers form a circle and dance, arm in arm, hand in hand, with the left foot put forward, while making rhythmical, graceful movements with their bodies, legs, feet and arms. A lead singer improvises the lyrics and the other dancers repeat them. This Ohuokhai leader has a special talent not only for singing but also, what is more important, for poetic improvisation. There song leaders compete at the national Yhyakh festival for the best poetic expression, best song and biggest circle.

Poetic improvisation of the Ohuokhai represents one of the richest and oldest genres of Sakha folklore.

The melody of the Ohuokhai is put to many types of music, from marching tunes to operas. Kylyhakh is the special singing technique of vocal cord vibration. This technique gives a unique national Sakha colouring highly appreciated by experts in "throat singing". The Ohuokhai plays an important role in the development of the musical and choreographic arts.

A famous folk singer, poet and composer, Sergey Zverev from the Suntarsky region added many new elements in the expressiveness of the movements.

References 
 Дидактический материал "Национально-региональный компонент на уроках английского языка" – Шамaева М.И., Семенова В.Д., Ситникова Н.В., Якутск 1995. (Didactic material "the National-regional component at lessons of English language" – Shamaeva M. I, Semenova V. D, Sitnikova N.V., Yakutsk 1995.)

Sakha Republic
Turkic mythology
New Year celebrations
Cultural festivals in Russia
Summer traditions
June observances
Observances on non-Gregorian calendars
Summer holidays (Northern Hemisphere)
Indigenous peoples days